Baylis may refer to:

Places
Baylis, Illinois, a village in Pike County, Illinois, United States
Baylis, Slough, a place in the English county of Berkshire
 Baylis, the seat of Alexander Wedderburn, 1st Earl of Rosslyn near Salt Hill, Windsor where he died in 1805
Baylis Road, a road in Lambeth, London, England
Baylis & Harding, the handwash company based in Redditch, England
Baylis Street, one of the main shopping streets in Wagga Wagga, New South Wales, Australia
Baylis Court School, a girls' school in Slough, Berkshire, England

Other uses
Baylis (surname)
Baylis–Hillman reaction, a reaction of an aldehyde and an α,β-unsaturated electron-withdrawing group catalyzed by DABCO (1,4-diazabicyclo[2.2.2]octane) to give an allylic alcohol
Aza-Baylis–Hillman reaction, the reaction of an α,β-unsaturated carbonyl compound with an imine in the presence of a nucleophile

See also
Bayless, a surname
Bayliss, a surname